The 2006 Asian Indoor Athletics Championships was an international indoor athletics event took place in Pattaya, Thailand, between 10 and 12 February. This was the first edition to be hosted in the country. A total of 24 nations sent athletes to compete at the championships, which featured 26 track and field events.

Kazakhstan topped the medal table with seven golds. China was second with six golds while Japan finished third with four golds.

Results

Men

Women

Medal table

Participating nations
A total of 25 nations were represented by athletes competing at the 2006 championships.

 (5)
 (5)
 (19)
 (6)
 (5)
 (11)
 (5)
 (2)
 (12)
 (2)
 (18)
 (8)
 (2)
 (5)
 (3)
 (9)
 (2)
 (2)
 (2)
 (6)
 (6)
 (2)
 (3)
 (46)
 (6)

References
Results

External links
Asian Athletics Association

Indoor 2006
Asian Indoor Championships
2006 in Asian sport
2006 in Thai sport
International athletics competitions hosted by Thailand